The 2020 season was São Paulo's 91st season in the club's history and their 60th in the top-flight of Brazilian football. São Paulo competed in 6 competitions: the Série A, the Campeonato Paulista, the Copa Libertadores, the Copa Sudamericana, and the Copa do Brasil.

Players

Current squad

Transfers

In

Loans in

Loan returns 

Total spending:  R$36 million

Out

Loans ended

Loans out 

Total income:  R$77.2 million

Statistics

Overall

{|class="wikitable"
|-
|Games played || 65 (13 Campeonato Paulista, 6 Copa do Brasil, 6 Copa Libertadores, 38 Campeonato Brasileiro, 2 Copa Sudamericana)
|-
|Games won || 29 (6 Campeonato Paulista, 2 Copa do Brasil, 2 Copa Libertadores, 18 Campeonato Brasileiro, 1 Copa Sudamericana)
|-
|Games drawn || 19 (3 Campeonato Paulista, 3 Copa do Brasil, 1 Copa Libertadores, 12 Campeonato Brasileiro, 0 Copa Sudamericana)
|-
|Games lost || 17 (4 Campeonato Paulista, 1 Copa do Brasil, 3 Copa Libertadores, 8 Campeonato Brasileiro, 1 Copa Sudamericana)
|-
|Goals scored || 110
|-
|Goals conceded || 79
|-
|Goal difference || +31
|-
|Best results  || 4–0 (A) v Oeste - Campeonato Paulista - 2020.02.225–1 (H) v Binacional - Copa Libertadores - 2020.10.204–0 (H) v Botafogo - Campeonato Brasileiro Série A - 2020.12.09
|-
|Worst result || 1–5 (H) v Internacional - Campeonato Brasileiro Série A - 2021.01.20
|-
|Top scorer || Brenner (22 goals)
|-

Goalscorers 
In italic players who left the club during the season.

Assists
In italic players who left the club during the season.

Managers performance

Competitions

Overview

Campeonato Paulista

Group C

First stage

Quarterfinal

Record

Copa Libertadores

Group stage

Record

Campeonato Brasileiro Série A

Results summary

Results by round

Copa do Brasil

Round of 16

Quarter-finals

Semi-finals

Copa Sudamericana

Second stage

References

External links
 official website

São Paulo FC seasons
Sao Paulo F.C.